Kilgobbin House is a country house in Adare, County Limerick, Ireland. The history of the house began in 1777 when Sir Richard Quin (later 1st Earl of Dunraven) married Lady Muriel Fox-Strangeways, daughter of the first Earl of Ilchester.  Richard's father gave him Kilgobbin, where the couple lived until he inherited Adare Manor.   It was the original seat of the Quin family, and served as the dower house after the construction of Adare Manor. It was the family home of Thady Wyndham-Quin, 7th Earl of Dunraven and Mount-Earl, who sold Adare Manor as a hotel in the 1980s.

References

Adare
Houses in the Republic of Ireland
Buildings and structures in County Limerick